Maciej Murawski (born 20 February 1974) is a Polish former footballer who played as a defender and midfielder.

Born in Zielona Góra, Murawski played for clubs such as Polonia Bytom, Lech Poznań, Legia Warsaw, Arminia Bielefeld (Germany), Aris Thessaloniki (Greece) and Apollon Kalamarias (Greece). From January to June 2009, he played for Cracovia Krakow.

At international level, he represented the Polish national team with whom he participated at the 2002 FIFA World Cup.

After the footballer career he was head coach in clubs Lechia Zielona Góra and Zawisza Bydgoszcz. From 2012 he is TV analyst and pundit, mostly known for his work for Polish Canal+.

References

External links

1974 births
Living people
People from Zielona Góra
Sportspeople from Lubusz Voivodeship
Association football defenders
Polish footballers
Polish football managers
Poland international footballers
Lech Poznań players
Polonia Bytom players
Legia Warsaw players
Arminia Bielefeld players
Aris Thessaloniki F.C. players
Apollon Pontou FC players
MKS Cracovia (football) players
Ekstraklasa players
Super League Greece players
Bundesliga players
2. Bundesliga players
2002 FIFA World Cup players
Polish expatriate footballers
Expatriate footballers in Greece
Zawisza Bydgoszcz managers